Eldar Bahram oglu Mansurov ( / , ; born February 28, 1952) is an Azerbaijani musician, composer and songwriter.

He is the son of musician Bahram Mansurov. His younger brother Elkhan Mansurov is also a musician.

Eldar Mansurov learned to play the piano in 1968–1972 under the supervision of Asaf Zeynally and in 1974–1979 he studied at the Uzeyir Hajibeyov Azerbaijan State Conservatory under the supervision of Jovdat Hajiyev.

He has taken part in many classical, as well as popular concerts and has written the soundtrack for a number of films and theatre productions as well as the songs "Bayatılar" and "Bahramnameh".

"Bayatılar", with lyrics by Vahid Aziz and music by Mansurov was performed by Brilliant Dadashova and was released in Azerbaijan, Russia, Turkmenistan, Europe (including Turkey, Greece, Germany, Spain, France), the Arab World and Brazil. The song was sampled and interpolated by many artists including Turkish DJs Hüseyin Karadayı and Cem Nadiran (in the song "Miracles") and Greek DJ Pantelis (in the song "I Have a Dream"). "Bayatılar" is the basis of the refrain of the 2009 Eurodance hit "Stereo Love" by Romanian musicians Edward Maya and Vika Jigulina. A copyright dispute over the song resulted in Maya acknowledging that the refrain in his song was actually taken from Mansurov's "Bayatılar".

Mansurov is married and has two children.

Discography

Albums
Fairytales of Ichari Shahar (2 CDs)
Without You – Sensizlik (2 CDs) Poet: Piruz Dilenchi
Motherland – Veten Saqolsun! Poet: Piruz Dilenchi

Singles
"Bayatılar"
"Bahramnameh"

External links 
 Eldar Mansurov — Azərbaycan Ordusu - Marş

References

Azerbaijani composers
1952 births
Living people
Musicians from Baku